Italianism may refer to:
 Italian nationalism
 Italian loanwords and musical terms used in English
 Italianization

See also 
 Anglicism
 Anti-Italianism
 Francism (disambiguation)
 Gallicism
 Germanism (disambiguation)
 Italicism
 Latinism